Jakubėnas is a Lithuanian language family name.

The surname may refer to:
Vladas Jakubėnas, Lithuanian composer, pianist, musicologist and journalist 
Povilas Jakubėnas (1871-1953), Lithuanian clergyman

Lithuanian-language surnames